The 1975 Lice earthquake struck the Turkish district of Lice at 12:20 local time (09:20 UTC) on 6 September. The epicenter of the  6.7 shock was located near the town of Lice and the maximum felt intensity was VIII (Severe) on the Mercalli intensity scale. More than 2,300 people were killed.

Tectonic setting
The tectonics of Turkey are dominated by the effects of the continuing collision between the African Plate and the Eurasian Plate. The main result of this collision is the southwestward escape of the Anatolian Plate by displacement along the North Anatolian and East Anatolian Faults. To the east of these faults, the plate boundary is a zone of orthogonal collision, with the relative displacement spread out over a wide zone, continuing as far north as the Greater Caucasus. The largest fault within the plate boundary zone is the west-east trending Bitlis frontal thrust and the 1975 earthquake is thought to have been caused by movement on this structure.

Damage
The main area of damage was located near the towns of Hani, Lice and Kulp. In Lice 12 out of the 13  mahalles (sections) of the town were completely destroyed. 6 schools, 6 mosques and 132 commercial buildings were damaged. In the 188 villages surrounding Lice that were affected, 5,555 houses suffered either severe damage or total destruction.

Characteristics
The earthquake occurred near midday without any warning. The shaking continued for about 20–24 seconds. The mainshock was followed by aftershocks that continued for more than a month. The focal mechanism for the earthquake suggests that it was associated with dominantly reverse movement on a fault plane dipping at 45° to the northwest with a significant sinistral (left lateral) component.

Response

National
A total of 15,000 Turkish soldiers were involved in rescue and relief work, with the first personnel arriving just 3 hours after the earthquake. The government set aside a total of 34 million dollars for repair and reconstruction.

International
Financial assistance from the international community, from both government and private sources reached a total of $14,837,058. The largest government contribution was from Saudi Arabia. Aid in the form of food and some other supplies from foreign agencies were treated with suspicion with much unfamiliar tinned food being sold for animal feed.

Aftermath
By 29 October 1975, 1,568 houses, 40 shops, a school, a mosque and a bakery were complete.

See also
List of earthquakes in 1975
List of earthquakes in Turkey

References

External links

1975 in Turkey
1975 Lice
1975 earthquakes
History of Diyarbakır Province
September 1975 events in Europe
1975 disasters in Turkey